is a railway station on the Yodo Line in Kihoku, Kitauwa District, Ehime Prefecture, Japan. It is operated by JR Shikoku and has the station number "G40".

Lines

Layout
The station consists of an island platform served by two tracks. By the side of one track, a station building is located with a waiting and ticket window operated by a kan'i itaku contractor. The island platform is reached by crossing one track along a paved walkway and then climbing up some steps. Parking lots, a bike shed and a public telephone call box are located outside the building.

Adjacent stations

History
It became a through-station on 12 December 1923 when the line was extended to Yoshino (later renamed ). With the nationalization of the Uwajima Railway on 1 August 1933, the station came under the control of Japanese Government Railways (JGR), later becoming Japanese National Railways (JNR). Subsequently, with the privatization of JNR on 1 April 1987, control passed to JR Shikoku.

See also
 List of railway stations in Japan

References

Railway stations in Ehime Prefecture
Yodo Line
Railway stations in Japan opened in 1914